Fahri Sümer (born 10 December 1958) is a Turkish boxer. He competed in the men's lightweight event at the 1984 Summer Olympics.

References

1958 births
Living people
Turkish male boxers
Olympic boxers of Turkey
Boxers at the 1984 Summer Olympics
Place of birth missing (living people)
Lightweight boxers